Wolfgang Schnarr (born 9 June 1941) is a German former footballer who spent 7 seasons in the Bundesliga with 1. FC Kaiserslautern.

Honours
 DFB-Pokal finalist: 1961.

External links
 

1941 births
Living people
German footballers
1. FC Kaiserslautern players
Bundesliga players
Association football goalkeepers